Lucas George Petitgout (born June 16, 1976) is a former American football offensive tackle in the National Football League (NFL). He was drafted by the New York Giants 19th overall in the 1999 NFL Draft. Petitgout played college football at Notre Dame. He also played for the Tampa Bay Buccaneers. Petitgout played a total of nine seasons in the NFL.

Early years
Petitgout attended Sussex Central High School in Georgetown, Delaware, where he played defensive line and tight end for the football team.

College career
Petitgout attended the University of Notre Dame and was a letterman in football. In football, as a senior, he was a Football News All-Independent first-team selection, and registered 74 knockdown blocks.

Professional career

New York Giants
The New York Giants picked Petitgout in the first round in the 1999 NFL Draft, the 19th pick overall.

Thrust into a starting role immediately upon being drafted, Petitgout played left guard and right tackle before settling as the Giants' left tackle in 2002. He was bothered by back problems in 2003 and 2004. He broke his leg midway through the 2006 season. On February 12, 2007, he was released by the Giants.

Tampa Bay Buccaneers
Petitgout signed with the Tampa Bay Buccaneers in March 2007.  Petitgout started out the 2007 season as the Buccaneers' starter at left tackle, but tore his ACL in week 4 against the Carolina Panthers. This injury led to Petitgout being placed on injured reserve, ending his 2007 season. The Bucs released him on August 16, 2008.

Personal life
Petitgout was sentenced to jail on December 19, 2015 for 30 days for harassing his ex-wife.

References

1976 births
Living people
American football offensive tackles
Notre Dame Fighting Irish football players
New York Giants players
Tampa Bay Buccaneers players
People from Milford, Delaware